"En värld full av strider (Eatneme gusnie jeenh dåaroeh)" is a song recorded by Swedish-Sami singer Jon Henrik Fjällgren featuring Swedish singer Aninia. The song was released as a digital download in Sweden on 26 February 2017 and peaked at number 23 on the Swedish Singles Chart. It is sung in Swedish and Southern Sami. It took part in Melodifestivalen 2017, and qualified to the final from the fourth semi-final on 25 February 2017. The song placed third in the final. It was written by Fjällgren, Sara Biglert, Christian Schneider, and Andreas Hedlund.

Track listing

Chart performance

Release history

References

2017 singles
2016 songs
Swedish-language songs
Melodifestivalen songs of 2017
Swedish pop songs
Sámi-language songs
Sony Music singles